Ludwig Arndts von Arnesberg (19 August 1803, in Arnsberg, Prussia – 1 March 1878, in Vienna) was a German jurist.

Biography
He was first appointed professor of jurisprudence at Bonn, then held the same position at Breslau, Munich and finally, in 1855, in Vienna, where he remained until his death. In 1848 he was a member of the National Assembly at Frankfurt, where he advocated strongly the right of Austria to enter the German Confederacy. In 1860, he married the composer and writer Maria Vespermann Gorres. In 1871 he was knighted by the Emperor of Austria.

Works
His chief works are:
 Lehrbuch der Pandekten (“Pandects textbook,” 14th ed., 1899)
 Juristische Encyclopädie und Methodologie (“Encyclopedia of Jurisprudence and Methodology,” 9th ed., 1895)
 Die Lehre von den Vermächtnissen (“Inheritance law,” 3 vols., 1875)
 Gesammelte zivilistische Schriften (“Collected writings on civil law,” 3 vols., 1874)
 Kritische Uberschau der deutschen Gesetzgebung und Rechtswissenschaft (“Critical overview of German lawmaking and jurisprudence,” in collaboration with Johann Kaspar Bluntschli and Joseph Pözl, 8 vols., 1854)

References

1803 births
1878 deaths
Academic staff of the University of Bonn
Academic staff of the Ludwig Maximilian University of Munich
Academic staff of the University of Vienna
Members of the Frankfurt Parliament
German emigrants to the Austrian Empire
People from Arnsberg
Jurists from North Rhine-Westphalia
19th-century German jurists